The Left Rights is the self-titled debut album by the Mindless Self Indulgence side project the Left Rights featuring members Little Jimmy Urine and Steve, Righ?. The album also contains a video of Mindless Self Indulgence performing "Panty Shot" live at CBGBs in New York City.

Track listing
"Parkinlot" - 0:34
"Montezuma Voodoo" - 0:07
"Take a Shit" - 0:53
"Access the Code" - 0:07
"Storytime" - 1:04
"Wag Yo Ass" - 0:07
"Fecal Freekal" - 1:10
"Homineau" - 2:00
"Word" - 0:44
"Qy10" - 1:30
"Cinco De Mayo" - 0:22
"Get Down Tonight" - 0:04
"Darth Vader (Who Gives a Sith)" - 1:17
"Swayze" - 0:16
"Place Disclaimer Here" - 0:35
"Sna Sna Sne" - 0:08
"If You Figure This Out, We'll Suck Your Dick" - 1:22
"Swipin' My Ass" - 0:08
"Hairless and Fancy-Free" - 1:18
"Pink Aqua Dress" - 0:37
"Hardonz" - 1:21
"Horny" - 0:07
"Mouseybrown" - 0:39
"Munkyjump" - 0:22
"Youcangolater" - 0:09
"Honkeys" - 0:26
"Metallica Doody" - 0:09
"Citizen Lust" - 0:53
"Chochas Vestidos" - 0:14
"Friends" - 0:29
"Pueidist" - 0:34
"Poo Out My Ass" - 1:01
"So Much for That" - 0:19
"ESP" - 0:24
"Weirdo" - 2:01
"Whoosh Whoosh" - 0:12
"Penitfomeyo" - 0:08
"Station Wagons" - 0:37
"Crap" - 1:17

There is also a B-side called "The Mask of Zorro". The 2002 live album Alienating Our Audience by Mindless Self Indulgence contains the Left Rights' videos "Darth Vader (Who Gives a Sith)", "Weirdo" and "Place Disclaimer Here".

References
The Left Rights Myspace

2002 debut albums